is a former Japanese football player.

Playing career
Kawasaki was born in Oita Prefecture on February 2, 1979. After graduating from high school, he joined the Japan Football League club Oita Trinity (later Oita Trinita) based in his local area in 1997. He played many matches as offensive midfielder from his first season and the club was promoted to the new J2 League in 1999. In July 2001, he moved to the J1 League club Gamba Osaka. However he did not play in any matches. In 2002, he moved to the J2 club Sagan Tosu. He became a regular player as an offensive midfielder and played often over two seasons. In 2004, he moved to the Japan Football League (JFL) club ALO'S Hokuriku. Although he played often in 2004, his opportunity to play decreased in 2005. In 2006, he moved to the Regional Leagues club Banditonce Kobe. He played as a regular player for two seasons. In 2008, he moved to the Regional Leagues club V-Varen Nagasaki. He played in many matches and the club was promoted to the JFL in 2009. He retired at the end of the 2010 season.

Club statistics

References

External links

1979 births
Living people
Association football people from Ōita Prefecture
Japanese footballers
J1 League players
J2 League players
Japan Football League (1992–1998) players
Japan Football League players
Oita Trinita players
Gamba Osaka players
Sagan Tosu players
Kataller Toyama players
V-Varen Nagasaki players
Association football midfielders